Ypthima yayeyamana  is a butterfly in the family Nymphalidae (subfamily Satyrinae). It is endemic to  Japan.

References

yayeyamana
Butterflies described in 1920